Polyrhachis xanthippe is a species of ant in the subfamily Formicinae. It is endemic to Sri Lanka.

References

External links
 at antwiki.org
Animaldiversity.org

Formicinae
Hymenoptera of Asia
Insects of Sri Lanka
Endemic fauna of Sri Lanka
Insects described in 1911
Taxa named by Auguste Forel